TellmeGen is a commercial genetic testing company.  Their legal consent document lists the name Genelink, S.L.

As of February 2023, the company's website listed contact information for Spain, the US, the UK, Germany, Italy, Mexico, Brazil, Peru, Panama, Colombia, Kazakhstan, the UAE, and Saudi Arabia.  The default website is in Spanish but is available in other languages.  TellmeGen says it follows General Data Protection Regulation, which is an EU regulation for data privacy.

References

External links
  (English version)

Genetic genealogy companies